Pitch angle can refer to:
 Pitch angle (engineering), the angle between a bevel gears' element of a pitch cone and its axis
 Pitch angle (particle motion), the angle between a charged particle's velocity vector and the local magnetic field
 Pitch angle (kinematics), the rotation about the transverse axis of a stiff body
 Pitch angle (aviation), an airplane's rotation about its transverse axis
 Pitch angle (ship motion), a ship's rotation about its transverse axis

See also
 Pitch (disambiguation)
 Euler angles